Tony Geraghty (born 13 January 1932) is a British-Irish writer and journalist. He served in the Parachute Regiment, and was awarded the Joint Service Commendation Medal for his work as a military liaison officer with U.S. forces during the Gulf War. He has been a journalist for The Boston Globe and was the Sunday Times Defence Correspondent in the 1970s.

Geraghty was born in Liverpool to an Irish Catholic family. He was educated at the London Oratory.

During the Falls Curfew in July 1970, while on assignment for the Sunday Times, Geraghty was arrested at gunpoint by a British soldier and charged with impeding the army by being on the street against a military order, which carried an automatic prison sentence on conviction. In September 1970 a magistrate ruled he had no case to answer, and acquitted him.

His 1998 book The Irish War: The Hidden Conflict Between the IRA and British Intelligence was written following research which included interviews with members of British Intelligence, the security forces, and the Provisional Irish Republican Army.  It describes the various tactics, both military and political, used by the protagonists in the Troubles in Northern Ireland.

Publishers Weekly called the book "highly opinionated" but praised "its attention to detail and its direct, potent writing." Library Journal said "[t]he role of British Intelligence in Ulster has never been so deeply explored".

On 3 December 1998 Geraghty's house was searched and he was interviewed by the Ministry of Defence Police and in May 1999, he was charged with breaching section 5 of the Official Secrets Act 1989 on the basis that he quoted from classified army documents in the book. The army was concerned that in mentioning their Caister/Crucible computer intelligence databases for tracking the population of Northern Ireland, and the Vengeful-Glutton number plate recognition and vehicle tracking system, he might have been in possession of copies of the documents.

The case was dropped in November 2000.

He has written several books on the Special Air Service. The Bullet Catchers is a history of close protection bodyguards.

He is the godfather of magician’s assistant Debbie McGee.

Books
Who Dares Wins: The Story of the Special Air Service, 1950–1980, 1980,
March or Die: A New History of the French Foreign Legion, 1987,
The Bullet Catchers, 1989,
BRIXMIS: The Untold Exploits of Britain's Most Daring Cold War Spy Mission, 1997,
The Irish War: The Hidden Conflict Between the IRA and British Intelligence, 1998,
Guns for Hire: The Inside Story of Freelance Soldiering, 2007,

See also
British military intelligence systems in Northern Ireland

References

1932 births
English writers
English male journalists
English people of Irish descent
British Parachute Regiment soldiers
Living people
British Army personnel of the Gulf War
Journalists from Liverpool
People educated at London Oratory School